Dominic "Dom" Corrigan (born 1962) is a Gaelic footballer and manager. He played for Kinawley and the Fermanagh county team. He later managed the Fermanagh and Sligo teams.

Family life
Corrigan received his education at St Aidan's in Derrylin and at St Michael's College, Enniskillen (where he would later go on to teach at). He then went to Jordanstown, winning an All-Ireland Colleges Trench Cup medal in 1984. He moved home to Enniskillen in 1987.

A member of a family of eight, Corrigan married Mary (née McCabe) from Aghadrumsee. Their first child, Tomás Corrigan, would go on to play for Fermanagh. He has another son, Ruáirí, also a Gaelic footballer.

Playing career
Corrigan is a Kinawley clubman. He made his debut for Kinawley as an eleven-year-old goalkeeper in 1973.

Corrigan played as a full-forward for Fermanagh. He was involved in the 1982 campaign, when he scored 1–3 against Tyrone in that year's Ulster Senior Football Championship (SFC) semi-final. Between 1982 and 1992, Corrigan won a Division 2 County League medal, an Intermediate Championship medal in 1988 (to go with the won he one in 1981) and sprinkled over with some underage souvenirs.

Ten years later, at the age of thirty, he was one of two remaining players.

Managerial career
Corrigan first picked up his whistle at St Michael's College, Enniskillen in the 1980s and went on to become "synonymous with Gaelic football" there. He led the college to a first Hogan Cup (All-Ireland) title in 2019.

Corrigan also managed Fermanagh and Sligo during the 2000s. He stepped down as Fermanagh manager in December 2003. As a 41-year-old that year, he was the youngest inter-county manager on the scene. He subsequently left his position as Sligo manager, due to difficult circumstances in 2006.

Corrigan won several SFCs in club management. As of December 2021, he had won championships with five clubs in three counties, a total of seven County Senior Championship titles. He was involved in coaching along with Pete McMahon as Castleblayney won a Monaghan crown in 1999 and 2000. Additionally, Corrigan managed Carrickmore in 2004, Clontibret in 2014, and Killyclogher in 2016. He led Ballinamore to a Leitrim Senior Football Championship title in 2021 when he was close to sixty years of age. This was a first SFC title for Leitrim GAA's most successful club since 1990, as well as Corrigan's sixth county title. He has spoken in support of the quality of football played in Leitrim.

References

External links
 "Dominic Corrigan wants GAA Special Congress to 'do what's right for our players'" Paul Keane, Irish Examiner, 19 Oct 2021

1962 births
Living people
Fermanagh inter-county Gaelic footballers
Gaelic football forwards
Gaelic football managers
People educated at St Michael's College, Enniskillen